Lijó is a Portuguese freguesia ("civil parish"), located in the municipality of Barcelos. The population in 2011 was 2,306, in an area of 4.42 km².

References

Freguesias of Barcelos, Portugal